Skulte Station is a railway station in Skulte, Skulte Parish, at one terminus of the Zemitāni–Skulte Railway.

References 

Railway stations in Latvia